Timothy Jon Kott (born 1967) is a retired United States Navy rear admiral and surface warfare officer who last served as the commander of Navy Region Hawaii from June 18, 2021 to June 17, 2022. Kott was dual-hatted as Commander, Naval Surface Group Middle Pacific from June 18, 2021 to June 3, 2022. Before that, he most recently served as commander of Carrier Strike Group 1 from June 25, 2020 to May 28, 2021, and prior to that, as assistant chief of staff for operations of Allied Joint Force Command Naples, his first flag assignment.

Early life and education

Kott is a native of  Newport, Rhode Island. He was born to Cmdr. (ret) James "Jim" R. Kott (died 2017) and H. Irene Kott with 3 siblings. He received his commission from the United States Merchant Marine Academy in 1990. He received a master's degree in Management (Financial Management) from the Naval Postgraduate School and a master's degree in National Security Strategy from the National War College.

Awards and decorations

References

Date of birth missing (living people)
1967 births
Living people
Place of birth missing (living people)
People from Newport, Rhode Island
United States Merchant Marine Academy alumni
Military personnel from Rhode Island
Naval Postgraduate School alumni
National War College alumni
Recipients of the Legion of Merit
United States Navy admirals
Recipients of the Defense Superior Service Medal